Pedro Olmos Muñoz (Valparaiso, June 11, 1911 - Linares, Chile, May 9, 1991) was a painter and illustrator Chilean folkloric character.

Biography  
His childhood and adolescence were spent in San Felipe. Later, he studied arts at the Pedagogical Institute of the University of Chile. In his college years he was part of the intellectual groups of the '30s, alongside the likes of Pablo Neruda and Juvencio Valley.

In 1938 he moved to Argentina where he specialized in murals and directed the exhibition hall of the Teatro del Pueblo de Buenos Aires. In 1946 he participated in the exhibition "Ars Americana" in Paris and the Exhibition of UNESCO.

In the late 50's he moved with his wife Emma Jauch, herself a noted Chilean writer and painter, to the city of Linares, where he taught at the high school of that city. He was also one of the drivers of Ancoa Group and one of the drivers of the installation of the Linares Museum of Art and Craft. He was also the restorer of the historic Museum of Yerbas Buenas, the "House of Romance".

Work 
The work of Pedro Olmos was of manners and figurative, which often portrays everyday situations of rural and urban life in the central area of the country. Included in his still lifes, portraits, signs of popular religion, folk scenes, among others.

Olmos used several painting techniques, such as oil, prints, drawings and murals. In this technique include, among others, made in the municipality of Linares with important figures in the area, or the Hospital the mine El Teniente.

References

External links 
 Biografía en Portal de Arte
 Artistas Plásticos Chilenos
 Catálogo de obras en la Universidad de Chile
 Pedro Olmos Muñoz, linarense de verdad (1911-1991). Diario El Heraldo de Linares del 5-5-2013, p. 5.

1911 births
1991 deaths
Chilean people of Spanish descent
People from Valparaíso
20th-century Chilean painters
Chilean male artists
Chilean male painters
Male painters
20th-century Chilean male artists